Gopalpur port is a  deep sea port of Gopalpur in Ganjam District, Odisha, India. The port has been developed on the banks of the Bay of Bengal. The seaport will increase the sea trade of Odisha, as well as industry and employment.

The Odisha government has set a target of completing the first phase of construction work for Gopalpur port by June 2019.

Harbor
The port harbor is natural and its depth is 18.5 meters. Mini cape vessels of over 100,000 DWT can be handled by the port. There are 3 jetties or berths in this port.

Transport
The port is connected to the Kolkata-Chennai railway line and National Highways. The port is connected by the 6 km long National Highway 59. The port is close to National Highway 16 (Kolkata-Chennai), providing good links with Gopalpur. The port is 160 km from Paradip Port and 260 km from Visakhapatnam.

References

Ports and harbours of Odisha
Transport in Paradeep